Moyu railway station is a railway station in Moyu County along the Kashgar–Hotan railway. It was opened on 20 June 2011. It is operated by China Railway Ürümqi Group.

History
The station was built in 2010.

References

External links
12306

Railway stations in Xinjiang
Hotan Prefecture
Railway stations in China opened in 2011
Stations on the Kashgar–Hotan Railway